All Along the Watchtower is a British sitcom that aired on BBC One in 1999, about an RAF site in Scotland, it was written by Pete Sinclair and Trevelyan Evans.

Cast
Chris Lang – Flight Lieutenant Simon Harrison
Roger Blake – Wing Commander Hilary Campbell-Stokes
Felix Bell – Airman Tench
Tony Roper – Iain Guthrie
Zoë Eeles – Eilidh Guthrie
Tom Watson – Douggie Maclaggan
Georgie Glen – Mrs Mulvey

Plot

The series focuses on Flight Lieutenant Harrison, a young up-and-coming RAF officer, whose job is to survey and then recommend RAF stations for closure.  The latest on the list is RAF Auchnacluchnie, Nuclear Command Bunker No. K553/44FS, a massive concrete Cold War facility and airstrip, which looms over the isolated Scottish fishing village of Auchnacluchnie.  Far from being staffed by the 300 crew he expects, he is horrified to find the site is actually occupied only by the eccentric, obtuse and war-ready Wing-Commander Campbell-Stokes and his gauche junior Airman Tench.  All the other staff have been siphoned off over the years and never been replaced, resulting in RAF Auchnacluchnie receiving the full quota of supplies and budget for its supposed population.  Campbell-Stokes and Tench have been left to eat from 100 pint tins of baked beans, make tea from 100,000 bag boxes of tea-bags, and keep ready for a war that will never come.

The startling state of affairs is considered just as bad by the local villagers, who see the site as an English establishment foisted upon them.  Harrison decides to file a report recommending the site's closure, but meanwhile becomes smitten with Eilidh, the pub landlord's beautiful daughter.  She single-handedly runs the local school while her boyfriend, the impressively muscular and unseen Hamish, is away working on an oil rig.  Alongside his romantic longings, Harrison realises that closing the site will have a profound impact on the village's school (which only stays open because Eilidh pretends she cares for the children of the 300 site staff).  Falsifying his report to London, he is dismayed to find it has not only been accepted but also that he has been posted to the station permanently.  Campbell-Stokes and Tench quickly accept him into the fold.

Episodes

External links
All Along the Watchtower at British TV Comedy Resources
 

1999 British television series debuts
1999 British television series endings
1990s British sitcoms
BBC television sitcoms
Military comedy television series
Television shows set in Scotland